Elizabeth Jeanette Powell  (born 4 February 1949) is a British-born Australian politician. She was a National Party member of the Victorian Legislative Assembly from 2002 to 2014, representing the electorate of Shepparton. She was previously a member of the Victorian Legislative Council from 1996 to 2002, representing North Eastern Province.

Powell was born in Prescot, Lancashire, England and emigrated to Australia as a child.  After a short time in the Melbourne suburb of Preston, the family moved to Shepparton in regional Victoria. Prior to entering parliament, Powell held a variety of occupations including film processor, television presenter, singer, marketing and sales, office manager and director of the family auto-electrics business. She was a Shire of Shepparton councillor from 1990 to 1994, and was the shire president from 1993 to 1994. After the 1994 council amalgamations, Powell was appointed as a commissioner with the Shire of Campaspe from 1994 to 1996.

Powell was elected to the Legislative Council seat of North-Eastern Province at the 1996 state election, becoming the first woman to represent the National Party in Victoria. In 2002, she shifted to the Legislative Assembly, successfully retaining the seat of Shepparton for the National Party upon the retirement of long-serving MP Don Kilgour. She was appointed state Minister for Local Government and Minister for Aboriginal Affairs following the Liberal-National Coalition's victory at the 2010 election, and served in those roles under both Premiers Ted Baillieu and Denis Napthine.

In February 2014 Powell announced that she would not be a candidate at the forthcoming 2014 Victorian State Election, and in a reshuffle of the Coalition ministry in March 2014, her portfolios were allocated to Tim Bull.

In 2022, Powell was appointed Member of the Order of Australia in the 2022 Queen's Birthday Honours for "significant service to the people and Parliament of Victoria, and to the community".

Powell is married with two sons.

References

External links
 Official website

1949 births
Living people
Members of the Order of Australia
Members of the Victorian Legislative Council
Members of the Victorian Legislative Assembly
National Party of Australia members of the Parliament of Victoria
English emigrants to Australia
21st-century Australian politicians
21st-century Australian women politicians
Women members of the Victorian Legislative Council
Women members of the Victorian Legislative Assembly
Victoria (Australia) local councillors
People from Shepparton